Walthall Robertson "Cap" Joyner (June 30, 1854January 5, 1925) was the 40th Mayor of Atlanta.

Biography
Born in Cobb County, Georgia, he moved to Atlanta at a young age and began as a volunteer firefighter at the age of 15. In 1872, at the age of 18, he was made assistant chief, the first of many promotions. He was fire chief of Atlanta from 1885 to 1906 until becoming mayor and the first southerner President of the International Association of Fire Chiefs.

He was Fire Chief when the Markham House burned to the ground.

He defeated Thomas Goodwin (incumbent mayor James G. Woodward didn't run)  in 1907 and under his leadership a memorial was made of the Wren's Nest after Joel Chandler Harris's death. During the Great Atlanta fire of 1917, Joyner was the State Fire Marshal of Georgia and led the firefighters that came to assist from outlying cities.

References
 early career
 Campbell, Steve B., "The Great Fire of Atlanta, May 21, 1917", Atlanta Historical Bulletin, Vol. XIII, No. 2 (June, 1968), p. 9-48

Notes

1854 births
1925 deaths
Mayors of Atlanta
American fire chiefs
International Association of Fire Chiefs